Kevin A. LaVallee (born September 16, 1961) is a Canadian former professional ice hockey forward who played eight seasons in the National Hockey League.

NHL
LaVallee started his NHL career with the Calgary Flames in 1980. He also played for the Los Angeles Kings, Pittsburgh Penguins, and St. Louis Blues. LaVallee played the last of his 398 NHL games (including playoffs) with the Penguins during the 1986–87 NHL season.

Europe
Following his NHL career, LaVallee played another nine seasons in various European leagues. He was with Innsbruck EV in Austria from 1987–88 until midway through 1989–90. He played for SC Bern for the remainder of that season. In 1990–91 He moved to Italy playing for HC Milano in 1991–92 he played for a different team in Milan. In 1992–93 He joined the Ayr Raiders of the BHL. Later that season he moved to EC Ratingen in Germany. He moved again during the 1992–93 season, this time to Ajoie in the Swiss National League A (NLA). In 1993–94 he went back to Germany with Düsseldorfer EG. He moved with the team in 1994–95 to the newly created Deutsche Eishockey Liga (DEL). In 1995–96 He started the season playing for the DEL's EC Hannover before returning to Switzerland and playing for HC Davos in the NLA.

LaVallee retired from professional hockey following the 1995–96 season.

Career statistics

External links

1961 births
Living people
Ayr Bruins players
Brantford Alexanders players
Calgary Flames draft picks
Calgary Flames players
Canadian ice hockey left wingers
Colorado Flames players
Düsseldorfer EG players
EC Ratinger Löwen players
Hannover Indians players
HC Ajoie players
HC Ambrì-Piotta players
HC Davos players
HC Milano players
HC Milano Saima players
Ice hockey people from Ontario
Innsbrucker EV players
Los Angeles Kings players
New Haven Nighthawks players
Pittsburgh Penguins players
St. Louis Blues players
SC Bern players
Sportspeople from Greater Sudbury
Canadian expatriate ice hockey players in Scotland
Canadian expatriate ice hockey players in Austria
Canadian expatriate ice hockey players in Italy
Canadian expatriate ice hockey players in Germany
Canadian expatriate ice hockey players in Switzerland